Maung Kyu (born 11 August 1970 in Myaungmya) is a Burmese sport shooter who competes in the men's 10 metre air pistol. At the 2012 Summer Olympics, he finished 39th in the qualifying round, failing to make the cut for the final.

References

External links
 

Burmese male sport shooters
Living people
Olympic shooters of Myanmar
Shooters at the 2012 Summer Olympics
Shooters at the 2006 Asian Games
Southeast Asian Games gold medalists for Myanmar
Southeast Asian Games silver medalists for Myanmar
Southeast Asian Games medalists in shooting
Competitors at the 2005 Southeast Asian Games
Asian Games competitors for Myanmar
1970 births